Panzer Kaserne (or Camp Panzer Kaserne), is a U.S. military  installation in Böblingen, Germany, part of U.S. Army Garrison Stuttgart. The post is administered by U.S. Army Installation Management Command-Europe (IMCOM-Europe), a legacy from its use as an Army installation since just after World War II. Panzer also hosts the headquarters of U.S. Marine Corps Forces, Europe & Africa (MARFOREURAF) and various Special Operations units of the Army and Navy supporting EUCOM and AFRICOM. There is also a different Panzer Kaserne in Kaiserslautern, Germany

History

Panzer Kaserne and nearby Patch Barracks were constructed in 1938 for the German Army, Panzer Regiment 7, 8 as well as Panzer Brigade 4 was stationed in Panzer Barracks from April 1938 (and both bases were joined by a specially designed trail due to the weight of tank traffic.)  Additionally, the training areas were designed to train and test the new tank crews who were assigned to the 8th Panzer Regiment. There is also a small nearby training area- unusual for a Kaserne in an urban or suburban area.

The 8th Panzer Regiment was the first unit assigned to the then Ludendorff Kaserne.  Local legend suggests that Adolf Hitler may have even delivered a speech from within the former Nazi Officer's Club building.  Additional myths suggest that Panzer and nearby base of Patch, were used for testing of new and experimental Nazi technology, specifically tank modifications and improvements.  Added to that, there is a myth that experimental tanks were disposed of by burial to prevent capture by advancing US troops. No one can verify for certain when the U.S. Forces accepted the transfer of the barracks, but it is believed it occurred in early July 1945.

During the Cold War, various units were assigned to Panzer - most notably units of the 1st ID (Forward) - a forward detached element of the 3rd Brigade 1st Infantry Division until 1990.

Most currently assigned units are devoted to the support of U.S. European Command (EUCOM) at Patch Barracks and United States Africa Command (AFRICOM) at Kelley Barracks located in Stuttgart.

Units currently assigned 
1st Battalion, 10th Special Forces Group (Airborne)
Naval Special Warfare Unit Two 
Naval Special Warfare Unit Ten 
Special Operations Command, Europe
554th Military Police Company, 709th Military Police Battalion, 18 Military Police Brigade, 21st Theater Sustainment Command, US Army
United States Marine Corps Forces, Europe and Africa 
POND Guard Force (composed of local nationals)
Federal Base Police

Source

Base services

Education
Panzer is host to a DODEA Elementary, middle, and high school for dependent children  and is served by nearby Stuttgart High School (formerly Patch American High School, 1979–2015). The International School of Stuttgart also operates a private Pre-K to 9th Grade dual-language school in nearby Sindelfingen as ISS BaSICS. The same school has an IB K-12 school located in Stuttgart district of Degerloch.

Shopping
The Base Exchange opened a new main shopping center for the Stuttgart Military Community at Panzer to replace the facility at nearby Patch Barracks. The  facility is organized like a mall. Panzer hosts a commissary and is also served by similar facilities at Patch and Kelley Barracks. Panzer has been selected as the site of a newer, more modern commissary, which will make Panzer the center for shopping in the area of the four bases: Panzer, Patch, Kelley, and Robinson.

Transport
Panzer Kaserne is served by the Stuttgart VVS bus service and two nearby light rail stops in Böblingen.

See also
List of United States Army installations in Germany

References

External links
 
 Panzer Hotel
 Panzer Commissary 
 Panzer Kaserne PX 
 Boeblingen Elementary/Middle School 
 International School of Stuttgart ISS BaSICS School (Bilingual Education from Pre-K to 9th Grade) in nearby Sindelfingen. 
 Home page of the US Army Garrison Stuttgart
 Official Stuttgart Military Community Newspaper
 Installation Guide for the Stuttgart Military Community 
 Spouses Group for Stuttgart Military and SOFA Expatriates
 Historic Information about the Stuttgart Military Community
 Stuttgart Subjects at Toytown Germany- an English-language community website for Germany.
 Uncovering mystery at the Panzer Kaserne Local Training Area LTA

Military installations of the United States in Germany
Buildings and structures in Stuttgart
Barracks of the United States Army in Germany
United States military in Stuttgart